Hekmat Khalil Karzai is the deputy foreign minister of Afghanistan. He was appointed as the deputy foreign minister on 21 January 2015.

At the ministry, he has chaired several national and international processes/forums including Heart of Asia- Istanbul Process, Regional Economic Cooperation Conference for Afghanistan (RECCA), and International Contact Group (ICG) amongst others.  He led the Afghan delegations in the first face to face talks with the Taliban in July 2015 and at the Quadrilateral Coordination Group (Afghanistan, Pakistan, China and United States) meetings with a focus on creating an enabling environment for the Afghan peace process.

Prior to his current appointment, He was the Founding Director of the Afghanistan's Centre for Conflict and Peace Studies. (CAPS). Under his leadership, CAPS become one of the leading research and advocacy centers in Afghanistan. In addition to the main office in Kabul, CAPS has regional branches in Kandahar, Khost, Parwan and Helmand.

Karzai has been engaged in various national processes with particular emphasis on the Peace Process and Youth Empowerment. In 2009 he authored a major initiative titled: Trust Building and Paving the Road for Reconciliation. As a result of his effort, CAPS provided pro-bono legal assistance to thousands of security detainees throughout the country.

Karzai also established the CAPS Strategic Shura, which works on various strategic levels and is an informal channel to deal with the challenges of the peace process on the ground.

Karzai is considered an authority on Afghanistan and has been invited to address the European Parliament and many think tanks including the International Institute for Strategic Studies (London) and Centre for Strategic and International Studies (Washington, D.C.) He has lectured in prestigious institutions of higher learning such as Harvard and Tufts University on security and state building. He serves as non-resident senior fellow at the East West Institute in Brussels.

In May 2002, he was appointed as the head of the Political Department at the embassy of Afghanistan in Washington, D.C. His duties included overseeing political and congressional affairs, serving as a direct link to the diplomatic and political community to liaise with US Congress and Executive Branch on policies, security, funding and other vital issues pertaining to Afghanistan.

Karzai has a Bachelor of Arts in political science from University of Maryland, United States of America; Master of Science in information technology from American University, United States of America and Master of Science in strategic studies from Institute of Defense and Strategic Studies, Singapore.

While working on a master's degree at the S. Rajaratnam School of International Studies in Singapore, he served as a RMS Fellow at the school's International Centre for Political Violence and Terrorism Research  in Singapore, where his primary focus was the South and Central Asia regions. He also conducted research in development, security and conflict resolution.

His dissertation on ‘Strengthening Security in Contemporary Afghanistan: Coping with the Taliban’ was published by the Kennedy School of Government, Harvard University. His study on suicide terrorism in Afghanistan ‘How to curve the rising suicide terrorism in Afghanistan’ was the first on the subject and was published by the Christian Science Monitor and the Straits Times (Singapore).

From 2004 till 2005, he served as an international fellow at the Edmund Walsh School of Foreign Service at Georgetown University where he conducted research on terrorism, violent extremism, the Soviet invasion of Afghanistan and the Al Qaeda movement.

Karzai has written extensively on Afghanistan, security (terrorism and insurgency), peace and reconciliation and his articles have been translated into many languages. He has also appeared on BBC World Service TV, CNN, CNN International, and Al Jazeera English, among others.

Karzai is the son of Shaheed Khalil Khan and brother of Shaheed Hashmat Khan. He was born in Kandahar and in addition to English he has fluency in Pashto, Dari and Urdu.

References

Afghan diplomats
Living people
Hekmat
Pashtun people
2010s in Afghanistan
21st-century Afghan politicians
Year of birth missing (living people)